Chembra Peak (Chembra Mala) is a mountain in the state of Kerala, India, with an elevation of  above sea level.

Visits to the peak are organized by the "Chempra Peak VSS" under the control of the South Wayanad Forest Development Agency; guides are provided for trekking. Chembra Peak is accessible by foot from Meppadi. The District Tourism Promotion Council provides guides and trekking equipment to tourists for fees. Banasura Sagar Dam and Banasura Hill is also nearby.

Gallery

References

External links

 

Mountains of the Western Ghats
Mountains of Kerala
Geography of Wayanad district